Matt Gallagher may refer to:
 Matt Gallagher (author) (born 1983), American author
 Matt Gallagher (Gaelic footballer) (born 1960s), Irish former Gaelic footballer
 Matt Gallagher (businessman) (1915–1974), Irish property developer and businessman
 Matt Gallagher (filmmaker), Canadian film director, producer and cinematographer
 Matt Gallagher (rugby union) (born 1996), English rugby union player
 Mike Gallagher (footballer), sometimes referred to as Matt, (died 1984), footballer